Archbishop M.C. O'Neill High School is a Catholic secondary education institute located in the Coronation Park neighbourhood of north Regina, Saskatchewan, Canada currently celebrating its 50th anniversary. It is officially designated as a community school. The student population is made up of individuals from the north, west, and central areas of town.

Named for a former local archbishop, Michael C. O'Neill, the school, a part of Regina Catholic Schools, offers instruction in both English and French Immersion.

Its feeder elementary schools include Sacred Heart Community School, St. Angela Merici School, St. Francis Community School, St. Gregory School, St. Joan of Arc School, St. Josaphat School, St. Mary School, St. Michael Community School, St. Peter School and St. Timothy School.

Clubs
Astronomy
Canteen
Assembly Band
Drama
Elevation Axis
Improv
Light & Sound
Rock Band
SADD
SRC
Yearbook

Sports
Badminton
Baseball
Basketball
Cross Country
Curling
Football
Golf
Hockey
Soccer
Softball
Track and Field
Volleyball
Wrestling

Notable alumni
Carm Carteri, former CFL player
Jordan Eberle, Current NHL player for the New York Islanders (attended but did not graduate)
Pat Fiacco, former mayor of Regina
Ken McEachern, former CFL player with the Saskatchewan Roughriders
Mike Sillinger, former NHL player
Randy Srochenski, CFL player
Mike Thurmeier, Academy Award-nominated animator

Affiliated communities
Argyle Park/Englewood (pop. 3990)
Coronation Park (pop. 6555)
Dieppe (pop. 1815)
McNab (pop. 1505)
Normanview (pop. 4280)
Normanview West (pop. 3240)
North Central (pop. 10,350)
Northeast (pop. 7090)
Prairie View (pop. 6325)
Regent Park (pop. 2755)
Rosemont/Mount Royal (pop. 8485)
Sherwood/McCarthy (pop. 6695)
Twin Lakes (pop. 5510)
Uplands (pop. 5610)
Walsh Acres/Lakeridge (pop. 7100)

References

External links
Archbishop M.C. O'Neill Catholic High School

High schools in Regina, Saskatchewan
Catholic secondary schools in Saskatchewan
Educational institutions established in 1966
1966 establishments in Saskatchewan